SM U-87 was one of the 329 submarines serving in the Imperial German Navy (Kaiserliche Marine) in World War I.
U-87 was engaged in the naval warfare and took part in the First Battle of the Atlantic. She sank some 22 merchant vessels before 25 December 1917, when  rammed U-87 in the Irish Sea and depth-charged her. Then the P-class sloop P.56 sank her. U-87s entire crew of 44 were lost.

Design
German Type U 87 submarines were preceded by the shorter Type U 81 submarines. The first of its type, U-87 had a displacement of  when at the surface and  while submerged. The submarine was powered by two  engines for use while surfaced, and two  engines for use while submerged. She had two propeller shafts.

U-87 was fitted with four  torpedo tubes (two at the bow and two at the stern), ten to twelve torpedoes, one  SK L/45 deck gun, and one  SK L/30 deck gun. She had a complement of thirty-six (thirty-two crew members and four officers).

Summary of raiding history

Fate and discovery
In August 2017, researchers from Bangor University in Wales announced they had discovered the sunken wreck of U-87 while conducting multibeam surveys 10 miles northwest of Bardsey Island as part of the marine renewable energy SEACAMS 2 project. Detailed sonar images reveal the wreck to be lying in one piece with what appears to be a large area of damage near the conning tower, presumably caused by in the ramming collision by escort P.56.

References

Notes

Citations

Bibliography

World War I submarines of Germany
German Type U 87 submarines
Ships built in Danzig
1916 ships
U-boats commissioned in 1917
Maritime incidents in 1917
U-boats sunk in 1917
U-boats sunk by British warships
U-boats sunk by depth charges
World War I shipwrecks in the Irish Sea
Ships lost with all hands
Protected Wrecks of the United Kingdom